Argininemia is an autosomal recessive urea cycle disorder where a deficiency of the enzyme arginase causes a buildup of arginine and ammonia in the blood. Ammonia, which is formed when proteins are broken down in the body, is toxic if levels become too high; the nervous system is especially sensitive to the effects of excess ammonia.

Signs and symptoms
The presentation of argininemia, in those that are affected, is consistent with the following:

Genetics

Mutations in the ARG1 gene cause argininemia, which belongs to a class of genetic diseases called urea cycle disorders. The urea cycle is a sequence of reactions that occurs in liver cells (hepatocytes). This cycle processes excess nitrogen, generated when protein is used by the body, making urea that is excreted via the kidneys.

The ARG1 gene provides instructions for making an enzyme called arginase, this enzyme controls the last steps of the urea cycle, which produces urea by extracting nitrogen from arginine. In people with arginase deficiency, arginase is missing, and arginine is not broken down properly. consequently, urea cannot be produced and excess nitrogen accumulates in the blood in the form of ammonia. Ammonia and arginine are thought to cause neurological problems and other symptoms of arginase deficiency.

This condition is an autosomal recessive disorder, which means the defective gene is located on an autosome, and two copies of the defective gene are required to inherit the disorder. 

Both parents of an individual with an autosomal recessive disorder are carriers of one copy of the gene, but usually do not have the disorder.

Diagnosis
The diagnosis for argininemia can usually be done using fetal blood sample. One can look for the following indicators as to the presence of the condition:
 Plasma ammonia concentration.
 Urinary orotic acid concentration
 Red blood cell arginase enzyme activity (measurement)

Treatment

The treatment for infants (individuals) with argininemia is the following, including medications:

References

Further reading

External links 

Amino acid metabolism disorders
Autosomal recessive disorders
Disorders causing seizures